"Ol' Time Killin'" is a hip-hop song by Kardinal Offishall featuring Jully Black, Allistair, IRS, and Wio-K, released in 2001. Produced by Mr. Attic, it was the second single from his second album Quest for Fire: Firestarter, Vol. 1.

Background
One day after performing at a club in New York City, Kardinal was in his hotel room talking to Saukrates, when he heard an infectious beat coming from downstairs. Saukrates told him that Mr. Attic of Da Grassroots was playing beats in his room, then Kardinal went downstairs to check it out. In an interview, he said:

The featured rappers, Wio-K and IRS (Korry Deez and Black Cat) from Scarborough's Monolith crew, were chosen by Kardinal, because he used to hang out with them, and musically, they shared the same level of energy. In order, Kardinal, Wio-K, and Korry Deez perform the first verse, followed by Black Cat and Kardinal in the second verse, followed by Kardinal, Korry Deez, Wio-K, and Black Cat in the third verse. Jully Black and Allistair sing the chorus and outro.

Samples

The song's chorus contains samples from "The MC" by KRS-One, "Murderer" by Barrington Levy, and "Murder She Wrote" by Chaka Demus & Pliers.

Remix

The remix features Busta Rhymes.

Part 2

In 2011, Kardinal released "Anywhere (Ol' Time Killin' Part 2)".

Music video
The music video was shot by Little X, as he was then named (now Director X), on a $100,000 budget. It used a brand new visual concept which was never seen on TV before. After the video was released, many people in the hip hop industry became a fan of Kardinal, including Pharrell Williams, Clipse, and Pete Rock. The song "Maxine" is featured at the end of the video.

Track listing

CD single
"Ol' Time Killin'" (Radio Edit Version)
"Ol' Time Killin'" (Instrumental)
"Money Jane" (Remix)
"Maxine" (Radio Edit Version)
"Maxine" (TV track)
"Ol' Time Killin'" (LP Version)

Chart positions

References

External links
"Ol' Time Killin'" Official music video at YouTube

2001 singles
Jully Black songs
Kardinal Offishall songs
Music videos directed by Director X
Songs written by Kardinal Offishall
2000 songs
MCA Records singles